Richard Larsen may refer to:

Richard F. Larsen (born 1936), former Lieutenant Governor of North Dakota 
Rick Larsen (born 1965), U.S. Representative from Washington

See also
Richard Larson (disambiguation)